Camp Cameron was a temporary U. S. Army camp located in Madera Canyon in Arizona Territory between 1866 and 1867.

Camp Cameron was established there at the base of the Santa Rita Mountains, after an epidemic of malaria forced the abandonment of Camp Mason.  Camp Cameron was about 16 miles northeast of Fort Mason and existed from October 1, 1866, to March 7, 1867.

References 

American frontier
History of Santa Cruz County, Arizona
Camp Cameron, Arizona Territory
1866 establishments in Arizona Territory